This was the first edition of the tournament.  
Rafael Nadal won his 62nd tour-level title, defeating Alexandr Dolgopolov in the final, 6–3, 7-6(3).

Seeds

Draw

Finals

Section top half

Section bottom half

Qualifying

Seeds

 Stéphane Robert (qualifying competition)
 Martin Kližan (qualified)
 Dušan Lajović (qualified)
 Aljaž Bedene (qualified)
 Andreas Haider-Maurer (first round)
 Facundo Argüello (first round)
 Diego Sebastián Schwartzman (qualifying competition)
 Pere Riba (first round)

Qualifiers

Qualifying draw

First qualifier

Second qualifier

Third qualifier

Fourth qualifier

References
 Main Draw
 Qualifying Draw

Rio Open - Men's Singles
Rio
Rio Open